Riverton Township is a township in Clay County, Iowa, USA.  As of the 2000 census, its population was 321.

History
Riverton Township was created in 1874.

Geography

The streams of Spring Creek and Stony Creek run through this township.

Transportation
Riverton Township contains one airport or landing strip, Spencer Municipal Airport.

Notes

References
 USGS Geographic Names Information System (GNIS)

External links
 US-Counties.com
 City-Data.com

Townships in Clay County, Iowa
Townships in Iowa